Acanthoscurria is a genus of tarantulas that was first described by Anton Ausserer in 1871. They are found throughout South America including the countries of Argentina, Bolivia, Brazil, Ecuador, French Guiana, Guyana, Paraguay, Peru, Suriname and Venezuela, plus into the Windward Islands West Indies, .

Diagnosis 
The main way they can be distinguished based on an organ found on the posterior trochanter of the pedipalp, and anterior trochanter of leg used for stridulating. But they can also be distinguished based on the palpal bulb and the tibial apophysis morphology.

Species
, it contains eighteen species, found in South America and the West Indies:
Acanthoscurria belterrensis Paula, Gabriel, Indicatti, Brescovit & Lucas, 2014 – Brazil
Acanthoscurria chacoana Brèthes, 1909 – Brazil, Bolivia, Paraguay, Argentina
Acanthoscurria cordubensis Thorell, 1894 – Argentina
Acanthoscurria geniculata (C. L. Koch, 1841) (type) – Brazil
Acanthoscurria gomesiana Mello-Leitão, 1923 – Brazil
Acanthoscurria insubtilis Simon, 1892 – Bolivia, Brazil
Acanthoscurria juruenicola Mello-Leitão, 1923 – Brazil
Acanthoscurria maga Simon, 1892 – South America
Acanthoscurria musculosa Simon, 1892 – Bolivia
Acanthoscurria natalensis Chamberlin, 1917 – Brazil
Acanthoscurria paulensis Mello-Leitão, 1923 – Brazil
Acanthoscurria rhodothele Mello-Leitão, 1923 – Brazil
Acanthoscurria sacsayhuaman Ferretti, Ochoa & Chaparro, 2016 – Peru
Acanthoscurria simoensi Vol, 2000 – French Guiana, Brazil
Acanthoscurria tarda Pocock, 1903 – Brazil
Acanthoscurria theraphosoides (Doleschall, 1871) – Peru, Bolivia, Brazil, French Guiana
Acanthoscurria turumban Rodríguez-Manzanilla & Bertani, 2010 – Venezuela
Acanthoscurria urens Vellard, 1924 – Brazil

Nomina Dubia 
 Acanthoscurria convexa (C. L. Koch, 1842) - Brazil
 Acanthoscurria cunhae Mello-Leitão, 1923 - Brazil
 Acanthoscurria melanotheria Mello-Leitão, 1923 - Brazil
 Acanthoscurria minor Ausserer, 1871 - Guyana
 Acanthoscurria proxima (Mello-Leitão, 1923) - Brazil

In synonymy:

Transferred to other Genera 

 Acanthoscurria acuminata Schmidt & Tesmoingt, 2005 → Umbyquyra acuminatum 
 Acanthoscurria cristata Mello-Leitão, 1923 → Lasiodora cristata
 Acanthoscurria dubia Chamberlin, 1917 → Phormictopus cubensis

See also
 List of Theraphosidae species

References

Theraphosidae genera
Spiders of Central America
Spiders of South America
Taxa named by Anton Ausserer
Theraphosidae